The VinFast LUX A2.0 is a four-door executive sedan produced by Vietnamese automaker VinFast since 2019. It was revealed at the 2018 Paris Motor Show.

Overview
The LUX A2.0 is designed by Pininfarina, It is based on the F10 BMW 5 Series.

The LUX A2.0 was revealed at the 2018 Paris Motor Show alongside the VinFast LUX SA2.0. The production of LUX A2.0 started pilot production in March 2019 with full production in September 2019 at Vinfast's Haiphong factory. The LUX A2.0 was priced at VND990 million ($43,043) before the price change to VND1.5 billion ($65,217).

Engine
The LUX A2.0 is powered by a 2.0 L BMW N20B20 turbocharged four-cylinder petrol engine that is mated to an 8-speed automatic transmission.

Safety
The LUX A2.0 received a five-star rating from the ASEAN NCAP from a crash test in September 2019.

References

External links 
 
 Brochure Sedan VinFast LUX A2.0

Sedans
Executive cars
Mid-size cars
ASEAN NCAP executive cars
Rear-wheel-drive vehicles
Cars introduced in 2018
L